Zofia Filipowiczowa (died after 1639) was a Polish woman who was accused of sorcery.

She was prosecuted for witchcraft in Gajona alongside three other women, accused by the nobleman Paweł Podlodowski of having caused the death of his father Jan Podlodowski and conspired to cause himself harm as well. She and her accused accomplices was sentenced guilty to whipping and exile.

The case against her has often been depicted in literature and theater, and played a significant role in the local folklore. It was described in Józefowi Ziębie's novel Zofijej Filipowiczowej czary czyniącej i za czary skazanej.

References

 Małgorzata Pilaszek: Procesy o czary w Polsce w wiekach XV–XVIII. Kraków: 2008

17th-century Polish people
17th-century Polish women
Witch trials in Poland
People convicted of witchcraft